Dr. Walter Rosenhain ForMemRS (24 August 1875 – 17 March 1934) was a German-born Australian metallurgist.

Early life
Rosenhain was born on 24 August 1875 in Berlin, German Empire, the son of Moritz Rosenhain, a merchant, and his wife Friederike, a daughter of Rabbi Benjamin Yosman Fink. The family emigrated to Australia when Walter was five years old, to avoid him having to do military service.

Education 
He was educated at Wesley College, Melbourne, and Queen's College, University of Melbourne, where he completed his course in civil engineering and was awarded an 1851 exhibition. Rosenhain then did three years research work with Professor James Alfred Ewing at St John's College, Cambridge.

Career
On the advice of his professor he took up the microscopic examination of metals, and spent some time at the Royal Mint studying the technique of his new work. This led to the discovery of "slip bands" and later, the phenomenon of spontaneous annealing in lead and other soft metals. In 1900 he became scientific adviser to Chance Brothers of Birmingham, glass manufacturers and lighthouse engineers, and for the next six years his work was chiefly concerned with the production of optical glass and lighthouse apparatus.

In 1906 Rosenhain became the first superintendent of the department of metallurgy and metallurgical chemistry at the National Physical Laboratory, he held this position until 1931. His department was initially a small one, but grew quickly and eventually became one of the most important metallurgical research laboratories in the world. He appointed the NPL's first female scientific staff members in 1915, Marie Laura Violet Gayler and Isabel Hadfield. 

Rosenhain published a large number of papers and addresses, and his highly trained staff also did much writing, covering the whole field of physical metallurgy, ferrous and non-ferrous. In 1908 Rosenhain published his book on Glass Manufacture, a second edition of which, largely re-written, appeared in 1919. Another volume was published in 1914, An Introduction to the Study of Physical Metallurgy, 2nd edition 1916, frequently reprinted. A third edition, revised and partly rewritten by John L. Haughton, was published after Rosenhain's death, in 1935. Towards the end of 1915 he delivered the Cantor lectures on optical glass before the Royal Society of Arts. These lectures were published as a pamphlet in 1916. In the following year he wrote the essay on "The Modern Science of Metals" for Science and the Nation, Essays by Cambridge Graduates. In 1927 he was appointed British delegate on the permanent committee of the International Association for Testing Materials, and was elected its president at the Zurich congress held in 1931. Rosenhain was a good linguist and gave lectures and addresses in many countries. He resigned his position at the National Physical Laboratory in 1931 to take up practice in London as a consulting metallurgist.

He was president of the Institute of the Optical Society and of the Institute of Metals. Rosenhain was Carnegie silver medallist in 1906 and Bessemer medallist of the Iron and Steel Institute in 1930. He was elected a fellow of the Royal Society in 1913 and jointly delivered their Bakerian Lecture in 1899.

In 1901, he married Louise, sister of Sir John Monash. He died of cancer in Surrey on 17 March 1934. His wife and two daughters survived him.

Legacy
Rosenhain was a man of strong personality, clear in exposition and an inspiring team leader. He did remarkable work with light alloys, on the mechanism of crystallisation, the mechanical deformation of metals, and the improvement of technical practice. His many papers were published in the Proceedings of the Royal Society of London, the Journal of the Iron and Steel Institute, and other technical journals. With P. A. Tucker he published in 1908 a volume on The Alloys of Lead and Tin, and in 1911, with S. L. Archbutt, one on The Constitution of the Alloys of Aluminium and Zinc.

The Rosenhain award of the Iron and Steel Institute was created in 1984.

References

External links
V. Eutectic Research.—No. 1. The Alloys of Lead and Tin By Walter Rosenhain, B.A., B.C.E., with P.A. Tucker – at Jstor.org

1875 births
1934 deaths
Australian metallurgists
Australian Jews
Deaths from cancer in England
Fellows of the Royal Society
People educated at Wesley College (Victoria)
University of Melbourne alumni
German emigrants to Australia
People from Berlin
Australian emigrants to the United Kingdom